Scandia is a hamlet in Alberta, Canada within the County of Newell.

History 
The 23.4 mile Cassils Southerly Branch of the Canadian Pacific Railway was built from Cassils to Scandia in 1927–1928.

Demographics 

The population of Scandia according to the 2020 municipal census conducted by the County of Newell is 169.

Attractions 
 Scandia Eastern Irrigation District Museum

See also 
List of communities in Alberta
List of designated places in Alberta
List of hamlets in Alberta
List of museums in Alberta
List of provincial historic sites of Alberta

References 

Hamlets in Alberta
Designated places in Alberta
County of Newell